The 1982 Israel Super Cup was the 12th Israel Super Cup (17th, including unofficial matches, as the competition wasn't played within the Israel Football Association in its first 5 editions, until 1969), an annual Israel football match played between the winners of the previous season's Top Division and Israel State Cup. 

The match was played between Hapoel Kfar Saba, champions of the 1981–82 Liga Leumit and Hapoel Yehud, winners of the 1981–82 Israel State Cup.

This was Kfar Saba's 3rd Israel Super Cup appearance and Hapoel Yehud's first. At the match, played at Yehud, Hapoel Kfar Saba won 3–2 on penalties.

Match details

References

1982
Super Cup
Super Cup 1982
Super Cup 1982
Israel Super Cup matches
Israel Super Cup 1982